The 2015–2016 Şırnak clashes were a series of armed clashes in the southeastern Şırnak province, between Turkish government forces and Kurdish armed groups, as part of the Turkish–Kurdish conflict.

Background
Following the 2015 Suruç bombing, the ceasefire between the Turkish government and the Kurdistan Workers' Party (PKK) ended after the PKK executed two police officers in their sleep on 22 July. In retaliation, the Turkish Air Force began striking PKK camps in northern Iraq, beginning a new phase of the Turkey–PKK conflict. The re-escalation of the conflict between the PKK and the Turkish government caused a rise of discontent in the Kurdish-majority southeast.

Military action

2015
The first armed incident in Şırnak Province took place on 28 July when the Turkish Air Force bombed PKK fighters in the countryside. The clashes in Şırnak began to escalate following a bomb explosion that damaged a section of the Kirkuk–Ceyhan pipeline within Şırnak Province on July 29 and an ambush by the PKK on July 30 which killed 3 Turkish soldiers. On 4 August, PKK forces attacked a guard post in Şırnak Province with an RPG, killing one soldier and injuring another. In a separate incident in the province, a mine killed two soldiers. Turkish F-16s targeting PKK camps in Hakkari Province in an act of retaliation. A PKK bomb explosion killed one civilian in Cizre on 5 August.

On 7 August, Turkish Police clashed with PKK and YDG-H forces in Silopi, Cizre and Uludere and PKK-affiliated militants hijacked a minibus in Beytüşşebap. 4 police officers and 1 army conscript were killed by separate PKK-affiliated attacks in Şırnak Province on 10 August. Turkish forces killed 2 PKK militants following clashes in Beytüşşebap on 13 August. Between 4–12 September, Turkey placed the first curfew on Cizre during which it launched a military operation against the militia YDG-H. 30 people were killed during the clashes, HDP leader Selahattin Demirtaş claiming 20 of which were civilians although the Turkish government challenged this claim. Heavy clashes in Şırnak Province took place between 25–26 September, with the PKK claiming to have killed 75 soldiers and losing 14 militants while Turkish forces claimed to have killed 36 militants and lost 2 soldiers.

On 21 November, Turkish Air Force targeted PKK positions in Şırnak Province.  On the 14 December the Turkish government declared a twenty-four hour curfew for the cities Silopi and Cizre. which were followed by large scale military operations by the Turkish forces launched on the 15 December against the YDG-H militias who set up barricades in the towns. By 17 December, Turkish forces had claimed to have killed between 55–70 alleged PKK militants in the two towns. The HDP leader Selahattin Demirtaş called on locals to resist the operations, denounced the government use of force, and called both the local people and government to find constructive actions. On 31 December, 1 soldier was killed and 5 others injured following a PKK rocket attack.

2016

On 19 January 2016 the twenty-four hour curfew in place since 14 December 2015 was reduced to a curfew only imposed in the hours between 6 pm and 5am.

See also
 Battle of Şırnak
 September 2012 Beytüşşebap attack

References

2015
Kurdish protests in Turkey
Kurdish–Turkish conflict (2015–present)
2015 in Turkey
2016 in Turkey
Military operations involving Turkey